Theodora Palaiologina can refer to:

 Theodora Palaiologina (Byzantine empress) (c. 1240–1303), Empress consort of Michael VIII Palaiologos (1259–1282)
 Theodora Palaiologina Synadene, half-niece of Michael VIII
 Theodora Palaiologina, Empress of Bulgaria, Byzantine princess and Empress consort of Theodore Svetoslav (1308–1321) and Michael Shishman (1324–1330)
 Theodora Tocco (died 1429), consort of the Despot of the Morea Constantine (XI) Palaiologos (1428–1429)